The Republican Association of New Zealand (NZRA) was a political organisation in New Zealand with the aim of supporting the creation of a New Zealand republic.

History
The Association was founded by left-wing activist Bruce Jesson in 1966, and gained wide publicity for its anti-royal activism, including the burning of the Union Flag and protesting during Royal visits. When the Governor-General Bernard Fergusson was awarded an honorary degree later in 1966 by the University of Canterbury, the NZRA and around 400 supporters tried to block Worcester Street (which was on the Governor-General's route to the university), chanting "We object to the honorary degree, the honorary degree" to the tune of The Beatles Yellow Submarine. Around 200 students counter-protested with a banner reading "We Love the Gov".

In 1967, Jesson moved the Association to Auckland and founded the original Republican Party of New Zealand.

See also
 Republicanism in New Zealand
 Republican Movement of Aotearoa New Zealand

References

External links
 NZ History.net: Opposition to Royal tours

Republicanism in New Zealand
Republican organizations
1966 establishments in New Zealand